Tutwell is a hamlet in the Tamar Valley east of Stoke Climsland, Cornwall, England, United Kingdom.

References

Hamlets in Cornwall